Muhammad Hizlee Abdul Rais (born 23 February 1989) is a Malaysian lawn bowler.

Bowls career

Commonwealth Games
Rais competed in both the men's singles and the men's pairs events at the 2014 Commonwealth Games. He failed to qualify from the group stages in the men's singles event, but won a silver medal in the men's pairs

Other events
In 2012 he became the World Singles Champion of Champions defeating Stanley Lai of Hong Kong in the final.

Rais has won five medals at the Asia Pacific Bowls Championships, including a double bronze the 2019 Asia Pacific Bowls Championships in the Gold Coast, Queensland and a gold medal in the Lawn bowls at the 2017 Southeast Asian Games.

In 2023, he won the fours gold medal at the 14th Asian Lawn Bowls Championship in Kuala Lumpur.

References

1989 births
Living people
Bowls players at the 2014 Commonwealth Games
Commonwealth Games silver medallists for Malaysia
Malaysian male bowls players
Commonwealth Games medallists in lawn bowls
Southeast Asian Games medalists in lawn bowls
Southeast Asian Games gold medalists for Malaysia
Southeast Asian Games bronze medalists for Malaysia
Competitors at the 2017 Southeast Asian Games
Competitors at the 2019 Southeast Asian Games
21st-century Malaysian people
Medallists at the 2014 Commonwealth Games